Gary Congdon (February 18, 1937 - September 24, 1967), was an American racecar driver.

Born in Palmyra, Wisconsin, Congdon died at the Autumn 50 in Terre Haute, Indiana in a crash in a midget car race, driving for Gene Hamilton. He drove in the USAC Championship Car series, racing in the 1965-1967 seasons, with 29 career starts, including the 1966 Indianapolis 500. He finished in the top ten 8 times, with his best finishes in 4th position in 1966 at Langhorne and at Fuji. He was the father of James Brian and Gary Paul Congdon.

1937 births
1967 deaths
Indianapolis 500 drivers
People from Palmyra, Wisconsin
Racing drivers from Wisconsin
Racing drivers who died while racing
Sports deaths in Indiana